The Nauru national Australian rules football team, nicknamed the Chiefs, represents Nauru in Australian rules football. Despite its small size and population, Nauru, which is the only country with AFL as its national sport, consistently ranks among the top eight teams in the world.

History

Australian rules had been played on Pleasant Island as early as 1916 with regular competition between local teams from 1921. As an Australian trustee, Nauru was the only overseas league recognised and supported by the Australian National Football Council in 1929. By 1954 its popularity had grown such that it became the only football code that children played on the island. 

Following Nauru’s independence in 1968 and the independence of the Australian territory of Papua New Guinea in 1975, an opportunity presented itself for a Nauruan national team to compete. The nation's first internationals occurred when the team toured Papua New Guinea a year later in 1976. Among the better players in the squad were Royong Itsimaera, Ali Iwagia, Johaness Itsimaera, Richardo Solomon, Vinson Detenamo, Manfred Depaune and Pres Nimes. Papua New Guinea went on to win the match by 129 points.

Until sometime after 1999, the team went by the nickname the Frigatebirds. In 2000, Nauru travelled to Queensland to compete in the inaugural Web Sports Cup. The side played against a team from Samoa and the Robina Roos of the AFL Queensland. Nauru won both matches. The team returned to Australia for the competition again the following year, this time defeating another two teams, including the Gold Coast Old Boys.

In November 2012 Nauru travelled to Suva to take on Fiji in a three-match test series. Nauru won the first two matches by a combined 140 points. The team re-asserted its dominance in the final match, securing the sweep with a 103 to 31 win. This test series was the first official AFL international ever held outside of Australia.

Players
Despite the sport's popularity and the national team's success, as of 2017 no Nauruan international has played in the Australian Football League. However, in 2008 seventeen Nauruan players competed in the Victorian Football League in preparation for the 2008 Australian Football International Cup. In 2012 Yoshi Harris played a few matches for Greater Western Sydney Giants's reserve squad and in the AFL Sydney. Though shorter in stature than the average AFL player, Nauruans are fast and athletic. Not a single player in the 2008 International Cup squad was over 183cm. Because of this height, the Nauruan style is to play close to the ground and is suited to playing in wet conditions.

Stadium

As the only Australian rules ground on Nauru, the Linkbelt Oval in the Aiwo District is home to the sport on the island. However, because the pitch surface is rock and phosphate dust, and markings are drawn on the rock with oil rather than paint or chalk, the ground does not meet standards for international matches.

International competition

International Cup

Nauru has participated in the Australian Football International Cup since the inaugural tournament in 2002. They have gone on to compete in every edition of the tournament, aside from 2005 when the team had to withdraw because of financial difficulties shortly before the games started.

Arafura Games

Nauru competed in the 1995 Arafura Games in Darwin, the first edition of the tournament to feature national teams. That year they were coached by former Geelong Football Club player Mark Yeates. Nauru went on to win the bronze medal that year. The Chiefs went on to win the tournament in 2001, defeating the Northern Territory Eagles in the final. The team did not compete in 1997 or 1999 despite national teams competing in the sport at those games.

Matches

Squads

2002 IC
Coach: Gonzaga Namaduk
Players: Alfred Spanner, Quinson Cook, Devin Grundler, Jericho Detenamo, Ramaraka Detenamo, Ken Blake, Javin Agir, Rudeen Spanner, Robert Timothy, Linko Jeremiah, Enoch Canon, Joel Joram, Aaron Canon, Paner Baguga, Merlin Talcka, Jaxon Jeremiah, Spencer Tannang, Brian Hiram, George Gioura, Jesse Uepa, Junior Dowiyogo, Raynor Tom, Vaiuli Amoc, Carlson Hartman, Paul Hartman, Xavier Namaduk, Cidro Namaduk, Slim Notte, Bayonet Aliklik, Syd Namaduk, Anthony Hiram

2008 IC
Coach: Manfred Depaune
Players: Trent Depaune, Priven Dame, Mallinson Batsiua, Agir Amwano, Rudin Spanner, Timothy Teabuge, Deamo Baguga, Clint Engar, Vili-Kesa Jeremiah, Torio Mwareow, George Quadina, Otto Adam, German Grundler, Brendan Waidabu, Ronpade Cook, Johnny Dagiaro, Neil Scotty, Rennier Gadabu, Nash Starr, David Dagiaro, Tiana Waidabu, Shadrach Notte, Pesky Agir, Adolph Muasau, Aronson Eobob, Derrick Seymour

2011 IC
Coach: Graham Pratt
Assistant Coach: Wes Illig
Players: Snuka Adire, Derio Namaduk, Febriano Baguga, Jude Cook, Otto Adam, Deiri Cook, Yoshi Harris, Kingston Ika, Maska Hubert, Maverick Batsiua, Johnny Dagiaro, Donatello Moses, Reason Satto, Trent Depaune, Nash Starr, Timothy Teabuge, Ralph Teimitsi, Mallinson Batsiua, Zac Temaki, Jose Uepa, Brendan Waidabu, Tiana Waidabu, Kabureta Dannang, Robroy Grundler, Kamtaura Kamtaura, Robby Deireregea

2014 IC
Coach: Paner Baguga
Players: Otto Adam, Snuka Adire, Lennox Agege, Jonas Amwano, Mallinson Battsiua, Maverick Battsiua, Kazaam Baui, Ronpade Cook, Charles Dagiaro, Johnny Dagiaro, Pilo Dagiaro, Aykers Daniel, Trent Depaune, Marcus Paul Detenamo, Hess Tekai Fiolape, DJ Grundler, German Grundler, Yoshi Harris, Mikey Hiram, Kingston Ika, Tipung Kamtaura, Donatello Moses, Dave Mwaredaga, Kenneth Oppenheimer, Timothy Teabuge, Zac Temaki, Jose Uepa, Greigor Uera, Tiana Waidabu

2017 IC
Coach: Zac Temaki
Players: Bronco Deidenang, Yoshi Harris, Kenneth Oppenheimer, Aykers Daniel, Joeson Kanimea, Trent Depaune, Tipung Kamtaura, Donatello Moses, Jencke Jeremiah, Richmond Spanner, Mikey Hiram, Mallinson Batsiua, Darnel Diema, Patrick Agadio, Dave Mwaredaga, Agir Nenabo Amwano, Kais Tatum, German Grundler, Tiana Waidubu, Charles Dagiaro, Jose TripleJ-Jems Uepa, David Japheth Adeang, Jeremiah Gil Kam, Devine Agir, Teolime Kamtaura, Tama Jeremiah, Niga Haulangi, Shawnkemp Maaki, Ishmael Fritz, Mick Vorbach

Youth sides
AFL Nauru also organizes youth sides, nicknamed the Stars. At the under-16 level the nation has experienced much success, including Oceania Cup championships in 2013, 2015, 2016, and 2019; and multiple second-place finishes; and appearances in the Barassi International Australian Football Youth Tournament.

Oceania Cup

Key

Gallery

References

External links
AFL Nauru Official Facebook

See also

Australian rules football
National Australian rules football teams